Villa de San Francisco is a municipality in the Honduran department of Francisco Morazán. 

Its social network is https://web.archive.org/web/20101014210406/http://www.villadesanfrancisco.com/

Municipalities of the Francisco Morazán Department